Opuntia tomentosa, commonly called woollyjoint pricklypear or velvety tree pear, is a species of Opuntia found in Mexico

References

External links

tomentosa
Flora of Mexico